The 1919 Rutgers Queensmen football team represented Rutgers University as an independent during the 1919 college football season. In their seventh season under head coach George Sanford, the Queensmen compiled a 5–3 record and outscored their opponents, 115 to 70. The team's victories included games against North Carolina (19-0), Boston College (13-7), and Northwestern (28-0). The team's losses included games against Syracuse (0-14) and West Virginia (7-30). Coach Sanford was inducted into the College Football Hall of Fame in 1971.

Schedule

References

Rutgers
Rutgers Scarlet Knights football seasons
Rutgers Queensmen football